Athletics competitions at the 1995 South Pacific Games were held at the Stade Pater Te Hono Nui in Pirae, French Polynesia, between August 17–24, 1995.

A total of 42 events were contested, 23 by men and 19 by women.

Medal summary
Medal winners and their results were published on the Athletics Weekly webpage
courtesy of Tony Isaacs and Børre Lilloe, and on the Oceania Athletics Association webpage by Bob Snow.

Complete results can also be found on the Oceania Athletics Association and on the Athletics PNG webpages, both also compiled by Bob Snow.

Men

Women

Medal table (unofficial)

Participation (unofficial)
Athletes from the following 12 countries were reported to participate:

 
 
 
 
 
 
 
 
/ 
 
 
/

References

External links
Pacific Games Council
Oceania Athletics Association

Athletics at the Pacific Games
Athletics competitions in French Polynesia
South Pacific Games
1995 in French Polynesian sport
1995 Pacific Games